The Keldysh Institute of Applied Mathematics is a research institute specializing in computational mathematics. It was established to solve computational tasks related to government programs of nuclear and fusion energy, space research and missile technology. The Institute is a part of the Department of Mathematical Sciences of the Russian Academy of Sciences. The main direction of activity of the institute is the use of computer technology to solve complex scientific and technical issues of practical importance. Since 2016, development of mathematical and computational methods for biological research, as well as a direct solution to the problems of computational biology with the use of such methods, has also been included in the circle of scientific activities of the institute.

Scientific activity

Nuclear physics
Prominent theoretical physicist Yakov Borisovich Zel'dovich headed one of the departments placed in charge of the theoretical aspects of the work on the creation of nuclear and thermonuclear weapons. Young Alexander Andreevich Samarskii performed the first realistic calculations of macrokinetics of chain reaction of a nuclear explosion, which led to the practical importance estimated power of nuclear weapons. In relation to nuclear energy, the institute was also involved in modelling of processes of neutron transport and nuclear reactions. In particular, E. Kuznetsov is known for his work on the theory of nuclear reactors.

Currently, such work in KIAM is continuing in the field of plasma physics and controlled thermonuclear fusion, which began under the leadership of S. P. Kurdyumov, .

Cosmonautics
D. E. Okhotsimsky directed the works in the department created for researches of dynamics of space flight. In 1966, the department was reorganized into the Ballistic Centre. The Ballistic Centre was involved in the calculations of optimal orbit trajectory and actual corrections for all space flights, from unmanned interplanetary and lunar vehicles to the manned "Soyuz" and orbital station "Salyut" and "Mir". The department also investigated the docking task, controlled landing and stabilizing the spacecraft.

The institute took an active part in the creation of the Soviet space shuttle "Buran".

KIAM continues to engage in performance of current Russian space projects. The current researches are connected with:
 development of systems for management and navigation of space vehicles in real time with the use of global satellite navigation systems GPS and GLONASS;
 studies of the atmosphere of the planets of the solar system;
 exploration of prospects for further interplanetary missions using electric rocket engines; 
 participation in such projects as "RadioAstron" and Fobos-Grunt.

Mathematics and Mathematical Modelling
One of the greatest mathematicians of the twentieth century I. M. Gelfand was at the head of the Department of heat transmission before his departure for the United States in 1989. He was carrying out the fundamental works on functional analysis, algebra and topology. A. N. Tikhonov worked initially also in these areas of mathematics. However, Tikhonov is better known with his works of more applied orientation, such as methods for solving ill-posed problems (Tikhonov regularization). Tikhonov also created the theory of differential equations with a small parameter at the highest derivative. Samarskii considered mathematical modelling as an independent scientific discipline. S. P. Kurdyumov created a whole scientific school in nonlinear dynamics and synergetics in Russia.

Currently, the existing arsenal of numerical methods is updated and improved in response to the growing complexity of the models and the possibilities of modern supercomputers. Scientists of KIAM elaborate grid methods for solving computational problems, which has led, in particular, to the creation of a declarative language "Norma".

Computers and Programming
The institute is always supplied with the most modern computer technology, which the domestic industry could put. The first studies were carried out still on mechanical calculators "Mercedes" by a large staff of estimators. In 1955, the first domestically produced computer "Strela" appeared, and, in particular, the orbit of the first satellite was calculated with use of it.

Currently, work is underway to create a distributed computing systems based on combining several supercomputers, which are used for grid – technology and developed a specialized operating system (DVM).

Robotics
Currently, work on the robotics are carried out in:
Work is also continuing on the establishment of six-legged walking machine.

Computational biology
Since 2016, the sphere of interests of KIAM includes also computational biology problems, which are solved in IMPB RAS – Branch of KIAM RAS in Pushchino.

Specialized research projects
 The project "RadioAstron"
 The project "Norma"
 The project "DVM"
 The project "GNS"
 The project "grid" (multiprocessor computations)
 The project "Virtual football" 
 International Scientific Optical Network (ISON)

Teaching and social activities
Most of the leading employees of KIAM worked part-time as professors of the Moscow State University and Moscow Institute of Physics and Technology.  was the organizer and first Dean of the Faculty of Computational Mathematics and Cybernetics.

 was engaged in mathematical education of secondary school pupils.

History

Milestones
The institute is located in Moscow, Russia. In 1978, it is named after Mstislav Keldysh. The institute was created in 1966 when it split from Steklov Institute of Mathematics. Already as the Department of Applied Mathematics of Steklov Institute it had conducted some outstanding research in the field of space exploration: in 1953 it developed the method of ballistic spacecraft descent, that was used on 12 April 1961 for Yuri Gagarin's return to the Earth, and in 1957 Sputnik 1 orbit was calculated there using the computer processing of optical observation data.

As a result of the reorganization in RAS of 2015–2016 years Institute of Mathematical Problems of Biology became a branch of KIAM.

Principals
 1953–1978 Keldysh, Mstislav Vsevolodovich, President of the USSR Academy of Sciences, mathematician.
 1978–1989 Tikhonov, Andrey Nikolayevich, Academician of RAS, mathematician.
 1989–1999 Kurdyumov, Sergei Pavlovich, Corresponding Member of the Russian Academy of Sciences, mathematician.
 1999–2008 Popov, Yuriy Petrovich, Corresponding Member of the Russian Academy of Sciences, mathematician.
 2008–2015 Chetverushkin, Boris Nikolaevich, Academician of RAS, mathematician.

The organizations that were separated out
 1955 — Dorodnitsyn Computing Centre.
 1965 — Space Research Institute, established on the basis of one of the departments of KIAM to develop scientific space flight programs.
 1990 — Institute for Mathematical Modelling, based on department .

Famous faculty and alumni
 Gelfand, Israel Moiseevich, Academician of the USSR Academy of Sciences, mathematician of world renown.
 Godunov, Sergei Konstantinovich, Academician of the USSR Academy of Sciences, mathematician of world renown.
 Lyapunov, Alexey Andreevich, Corresponding Member of the USSR Academy of Sciences, one of the founders of cybernetics in the USSR.
 Okhotsimsky, Dmitry Yevgenyevich, Academician of RAS, cosmonautics and robotics.
 Eneev, Timur Magometovich, Academician of RAS, cosmonautics and cosmogony. 
 Yablonsky, Sergey Vsevolodovich, Corresponding Member of RAS, one of the founders of cybernetics in the USSR.
 Yanenko, Nikolai Nikolaevich, Academician of the USSR Academy of Sciences, mathematician and engineer.
 Zel'dovich, Yakov Borisovich, Academician of the USSR Academy of Sciences, nuclear physics и astrophysics.

References

External links
 Institute web site

Educational institutions established in 1966
Mathematical institutes
Institutes of the Russian Academy of Sciences
Universities and institutes established in the Soviet Union
Research institutes in the Soviet Union
1966 establishments in the Soviet Union